Callum Stone is  a fictional character in the long-running police drama The Bill portrayed by Sam Callis.

Character development
In one storyline Sam and PC Emma Keane (Melanie Gutteridge) attend the scene of an explosion. Sam discovers that a man has been posing as a medic to assault female victims. He leaves Emma behind to reprimand the imposter and she is caught up in a second explosion. Callis told Allison Maund from Inside Soap that his character views the fake medics actions as "heinous" and is determined to find him. Emma is one of Callum's PC and also someone he harbours feelings for. Callis explained that Callum took his "took his eye off the ball". He and Emma have had "a tricky time" and his feelings leave him "racked with guilt on both a professional and personal level". The actor was proud of the stunt scenes; which he thought were "shocking stuff" and would look "fantastic" on-screen. He told Maund that the filming was hectic because he had much to do in a small amount of time. Callis was also frightened by the explosions and praised their realism.

Plot background

When Stone was sixteen, he left home after his father was accused of rape.  Stone's father was an inspector in the police force and was accused of raping probationer Kelly Ryan.  Stone believed Ryan's allegation, but his mother chose to believe his father, so Stone asked his mother to choose between them.  She chose his father, and Stone felt he had to leave home.  He then joined the police force "to punish him".

Storylines

Arrival
Shortly after Stone's arrival at Sun Hill, he allowed a man to commit suicide in front of him and PC Will Fletcher. Fletcher felt guilty, believing he could have saved the man's life, while Stone believed he had acted appropriately as the man was a violent criminal.

Furthermore, when PC Sally Armstrong crashed her car whilst drunk, she went to Stone who arranged an alibi for Sally. With some help from PC Ben Gayle, Sally was able to escape being charged for drink-driving. Stone then used the situation to his advantage, using his power over people like Sally to get them to do things they might not normally do.

A person aware of Stone's 'gang' was PC Emma Keane, who had realised that Stone had a hold over Will Fletcher and Sally Armstrong. Emma manipulates Stone into admitting that he has a gang, before staging a kiss – when he finally leant in to reciprocate Emma pulled out and revealed that she knew that Stone has feelings for her. It became clear that Stone was only being protective of Emma by not letting her in his 'gang'. However, Emma's determination to prove herself led her to getting killed in an explosion, after trying to save others, despite orders to evacuate the building.

Feud with Sergeant Smith

Stone was considered as the new Inspector to replace Gina Gold, but it was decided not to promote Stone after Gina said that she thought he would prefer to be out there on the front line with his team. Newcomer Rachel Weston was promoted to Inspector by Superintendent John Heaton. After Weston left, Smithy was promoted to Inspector.

In episode 001, "Conviction" Stone discovered that Smithy had beaten up Jason Devlin, a man who had just attacked Stevie Moss. Stone encouraged Smithy to lie and claim that he had discovered Devlin in his condition. Smithy finally agreed, not wanting to lose his job, but continued to feel guilty over what he had done. In the following episode, 003 "Riot City" Stone and Smithy led the rest of the uniform team on a practice scenario to give them experience in dealing with riots. After Stone broke his orders from Rachel Weston he ended up fighting with Smithy, mainly being a way for Smithy to vent his anger and frustration over what had happened with Devlin. Smithy was eventually cleared of any wrongdoing.

Attack

In the episode "Crossing the Line", Stone is badly beaten when he steps into an argument between Clarinda Blake and another man.  Questioned by Inspector Smith and Sergeant Masters, Blake tells them that someone was trying to steal her bag, but she does not wish to pursue any complaint.

Back at home, Stone finds himself unable to grip his kettle because of his injuries. In a fit of rage, he smashes the kettle by throwing it to the floor.

From the photo ID, Stone picks out a "James Cook", but investigations later reveal the person Stone picked out to be imprisoned. Looking at the photo, Sergeant Masters realises that the image is identical to Tim Hardacre, a person to whom she had recently spoken at Clarinda's pub. They find that James Cook has convictions for grievous bodily harm but it is then confirmed that he is currently in prison. Tim Hardacre is subsequently arrested and it is found out that he is a drug dealer selling drugs through Clarinda's child and this is why she was beaten up.

Just before Stone's counselling session, Inspector Smith tells him that the case is going to collapse.  Stone assures Smith that he can accept this. In his counselling session with Nancy Faber, Stone tells Nancy that he blames himself for the assault, and he feels that he failed everyone involved. Stone blames himself because he let his "guard slip". Stone starts to think that he is in the wrong job, before finally admitting that he is a victim.

Later, Hardacre is freed from police custody, Stone follows him into a busy shopping area.  Noticing CCTV cameras, Stone pulls his hood up before heading down an alleyway.  He catches up with Hardacre, pulls him into the alleyway and severely beats him up.

Allegations of Assault

In the episode "Red Tape", a week after the incident with Hardacre that remains unsolved, Stone is accused of punching a man during a disturbance outside a nightclub. After the man is revealed to be a respectable and innocent passer-by who had an epileptic seizure, the incident is investigated, by Area Commander Lisa Kennedy, especially when the alleged assault is videoed and posted on the internet. Stone is later identified during an identity parade, and is temporarily suspended from duty.

Death of his father

In August 2010 Stone's father dies, and Stone turns up uninvited to the funeral.  His mother makes it clear that she does not want him there, but Stone insists on staying saying, "When he goes into the ground, I want to be there, so I'm sure".  At his father's graveside Stone attempts to speak to his mother, but she makes it clear she has not forgiven him for believing Ryan over his own father.

Looking for some answers, Stone requests the details on the case from the police force and goes to visit Ryan.  When Ryan admits to him that she was raped, she gives Stone a letter of apology addressed to her from his father, blaming alcohol for the attack.  Stone takes this along with photographic evidence to his mother's house and attempts to show it to her, but she rips up the letter without reading it.  Stone is then thrown out of the house by mourners and told by his mother never to return.

Later, Stone goes to his father's graveside where he notices flowers from his mother.  In front of the card left in the flowers, Stone places the ripped up letter of apology.

References

External links
Character profile at The Bill official website

Fictional police sergeants
Fictional British police officers
Television characters introduced in 2007
Fictional people from London
The Bill